
In structural semantics, the actantial model, also called the actantial narrative schema, is a tool used to analyze the action that takes place in a story, whether real or fictional. It was developed in 1966 by semiotician Algirdas Julien Greimas.

The model considers an action as divided into six facets, called actants. Those actants are a combined framework inspired mainly between Vladimir Propp's and Étienne Souriau's actantial theories.

Greimas took the term actant from linguist Lucien Tesnière, who coined the term in his discussion of the grammar of noun phrases.

Basic summary
Greimas actantial model distinguishes characters and action elements according to their function within the plot. 

The model differentiates between
Subject / Object
Helper / Opponent
Sender / Receiver
Power

The subject desires a usually abstract object. The helper supports the subject in obtaining the object. The opponent, however, works against the helper and tries to prevent the subject from gaining the object. The sender initiates the action and the receiver profits from the action and/or the object. Whether or not the subject will acquire the desired object depends on the abstract power often connected to the subject. Analysing characters according to the actantial model enables a detailed breakdown of the characters' function within the plot but also creates a simplified character constellation in association with the action.

See also
Semiotic square
Vladimir Propp

Notes

Sources
 Greimas, Algirdas Julien. 1973. "Actants, Actors, and Figures." On Meaning: Selected Writings in Semiotic Theory. Trans. Paul J. Perron and Frank H, Collins. Theory and History of Literature, 38. Minneapolis: U of Minnesota P, 1987. 106–120.
Herbert, Louis (2006) Tools for Text and Image Analysis: An Introduction to Applied Semiotics, online eboook, published by Texto !
Herbert, Louis (2006) The Actantial Model, in Louis Hébert (dir.), Signo [online], Rimouski (Quebec), http://www.signosemio.com

Further reading
Felluga, Dino  Modules on Greimas: On the Semiotic Square. Introductory Guide to Critical Theory.
Felluga, Dino. Modules on Greimas: On Plotting. Introductory Guide to Critical Theory.

External links
Sémantique de la phrase - I Schéma actantiel

Semiotics